Run Run Run may refer to:

 Run Run Run (band), an American indie rock band
 "Run, Run, Run" (The Supremes song), a 1964 song written by Holland–Dozier–Holland
 "Run Run Run" (The Velvet Underground song), a 1967 song
 "Run Run Run" (Celeste Buckingham song)
 "Run Run Run", a song by Concrete Blonde from the 1989 album "Free"
 "Run Run Run" (Phoenix song), a 2004 song
 "Run Run Run" (High and Mighty Color song), a 2005 song
 "Run Run Run" (Tokio Hotel / Kelly Clarkson song), a song by Tokio Hotel from their 2014 album Kings of Suburbia and Kelly Clarkson from her 2015 album Piece by Piece.
 "Run Run Run", a song by Dragonette from their 2012 album Bodyparts
 "Run Run Run", a song by The Who from the 1966 album A Quick One
 "Run Run Run", a song by Sly and the Family Stone from their debut album A Whole New Thing
 "Run Run Run", a song by Goldenhorse from the 2005 album Out of the Moon
 "Run Run Run", a song by The Kinetiks from the 2007 EP High Horse Olympics
 "Run Run Run", a song by Jo Jo Gunne
 "Run Run Run", a song by The Third Rail
 "Run, Run, Run", a song by The Gestures
 "Run-Run-Run", a song by Natasha Bedingfield from the 2010 album Strip Me
 "Run Run", a song by Indila from the 2014 album Mini World
 "Run Run", a song by Jolin Tsai from the 2009 album Jeneration